is a train station in Miyazaki City, Miyazaki Prefecture, Japan.

Lines

Layout 
The station, which is unstaffed, consists of an island platform serving two tracks at grade set in a largely residential area. The station building is located on the east side of the tracks and is a timber building decorated with triangular gables and stained glass. It is unstaffed and serves only as a waiting room. A level crossing leads to the island platform where an automatic ticket vending machine is located. A separate station entrance on the west side has also been constructed which includes a bike shed and a station forecourt with a bus stop and a traffic roundabout. From there a level crossing leads to the island platform.

Adjacent stations

History
The station closed when the Miyazaki Railway ceased operations on 1 July 1962. Subsequently, Japanese National Railways (JNR) extended its then Shibushi Line north from  towards Minami-Miyazaki on the same route and reopened Minamikata as an intermediate station on 8 May 1963. With the privatization of JNR on 1 April 1987, the station came under the control of JR Kyushu.

Passenger statistics
In fiscal 2016, the station was used by an average of 353 passengers daily (boarding passengers only), and it ranked 287th among the busiest stations of JR Kyushu.

Surrounding area
University of Miyazaki

See also
List of railway stations in Japan

References

External links
Kibana (JR Kyushu)

Railway stations in Miyazaki Prefecture
Railway stations in Japan opened in 1913
Miyazaki (city)